Álvaro Santamaría Arenas (born 7 November 2001) is a Spanish professional footballer who plays as a forward for Sporting B.

Club career
Born in Gijón, Asturias, Santamaría joined Sporting de Gijón's Mareo in 2019, from Fútbol Colegio Inmaculada de Gijón. He made his senior debut with the reserves on 21 December of that year, coming on as a second-half substitute for Gaspar Campos in a 1–1 Segunda División B away draw against UP Langreo.

On 15 July 2020, after finishing his formation, Santamaría extended his contract with the club and was definitely promoted to the B-side. He scored his first senior goal on 17 October, netting his team's second in a 2–4 home loss against Cultural y Deportiva Leonesa.

Santamaría made his first-team debut on 12 November 2021, replacing Christian Rivera in a 0–1 home loss against Real Sociedad B in the Segunda División.

Personal life
Santamaría's relative Eugenio was also a footballer and a forward. He notably represented amateur sides before playing one single match for Sporting in 1952.

References

External links

2001 births
Living people
Footballers from Gijón
Spanish footballers
Association football forwards
Segunda División players
Segunda División B players
Tercera Federación players
Sporting de Gijón B players
Sporting de Gijón players